Dupree Municipal Airport  was a public-use airport located in Dupree, a city in Ziebach County, South Dakota, United States. The City of Dupree decided to close the airport in 2010.

Facilities and aircraft 
Dupree Municipal Airport covered an area of 47 acres (19 ha) at an elevation of 2,341 feet (714 m) above mean sea level. It has one runway designated 14/32 with a turf surface measuring 2,400 by 200 feet (732 x 61 m).

References

External links 
 Dupree (7F2) at South Dakota DOT Airport Directory
 Aerial image as of September 1997 from USGS The National Map

Defunct airports in the United States
Airports in South Dakota
Buildings and structures in Ziebach County, South Dakota
Transportation in Ziebach County, South Dakota